Boadu is a surname. Notable people with the surname include:

James Boadu (born 1985), Ghanaian footballer
Mavis Nkansah Boadu (born 1989), Ghanaian politician
Myron Boadu (born 2001), Dutch footballer
Richard Boadu (born 1998), Ghanaian footballer

Ghanaian surnames